Tephraciura is a genus of tephritid  or fruit flies in the family Tephritidae.

Species
Tephraciura angusta (Loew, 1861)
Tephraciura basimacula (Bezzi, 1924)
Tephraciura flavimacula Hancock, 1991
Tephraciura latecuneata (Munro, 1947)
Tephraciura oborinia (Walker, 1849)
Tephraciura pachmarica Agarwal & Kapoor, 1988
Tephraciura phantasma (Hering, 1935)
Tephraciura semiangusta (Bezzi, 1918)
Tephraciura sphenoptera (Bezzi, 1924)
Tephraciura tulearensis Hancock, 1991

References

Tephritinae
Tephritidae genera
Diptera of Africa